The Latin Grammy Award for Best Regional Mexican Song is an honor presented annually at the Latin Grammy Awards, a ceremony that recognizes excellence and creates a wider awareness of cultural diversity and contributions of Latin recording artists in the United States and internationally. The award is reserved to the songwriters of a new song containing at least 51% of the lyrics in Spanish. Instrumental recordings or cover songs are not eligible. Since its inception, the award category has had one name change. From 2000 to 2012 the award was known as Best Regional Mexican Song.  In 2013, the category name was changed to Best Regional Song. In 2016, the award was changed back to Best Regional Mexican Song.

The award was first presented to Colombian songwriter Kike Santander for the track "Mi Verdad", performed by Mexican singer Alejandro Fernández. Mexican singer-songwriter Marco Antonio Solís is the most awarded songwriter with four wins; in 2011 Solís' song "¿A Dónde Vamos a Parar?" became the first regional song to be nominated for Song of the Year. American singer Jimmy González is the most nominated performer without a win, with two unsuccessful nominations.

The award has only been presented to songwriters originating from Colombia, Mexico and the United States. Mexican songwriters have won a total of eleven times and American songwriters have received the award on four occasions.

Winners and nominees

2000s

2010s

2020s

 Each year is linked to the article about the Latin Grammy Awards held that year.
 The performing artist is only listed but does not receive the award.
 Showing the name of the songwriter(s), the nominated song and in parentheses the performer's name(s).

See also
Latin Grammy Award for Song of the Year
Lo Nuestro Award for Regional Mexican Song of the Year

References

General
  Note: User must select the "Regional Mexican Field" category as the genre under the search feature.

Specific

External links
Official website of the Latin Grammy Awards

 
Song awards
Regional Mexican songs
Ranchero Mariachi Album
Regional Mexican Song
Songwriting awards